Silver Creek Township is a township in Stephenson County, Illinois. As of the 2010 census, its population was 696 and it contained 332 housing units.

Geography
Silver Creek is Townships 26 and 27 (part) North, Range 8 East of the Fourth Principal Meridian.

Silver Creek Township borders the city of Freeport, the county seat of Stephenson County, to the northwest.

History
Thomas Craine first settled Silver Creek Township in August 1835.

Mills
Brown's Mill was built four miles east of Freeport on the Pecatonica River by Caleb W. Brown in 1857. The stone grist mill closed in 1903 and was converted to a power plant by A.J. Goddard in 1908. For a short time it generated power for the street car system in Freeport. After a fire in 1950 partially destroyed the building it was rebuilt and converted to a residence. It was still standing on Brown's Mill Road in 2014.

Demographics

As of the census of 2000, there were 739 people, 293 households, and 219 families in Silver Creek Township.

References

External links
Stephenson County Official Site

Townships in Stephenson County, Illinois
Townships in Illinois